Vincent Moscaritolo is semi-retired American computer security expert known for work in encryption applications for mobile devices.

As of late, he has been prolifically writing about Raspberry Pi Projects on Substack.

From 2012 to 2015, he was the Distinguished Member of Technical Staff at Silent Circle, where he designed the original messaging technologies Silent Circle uses.  In 2015, he left Silent Circle to co-found 4th-A Technologies, LLC with Robbie Hanson. 4th-A Technologies develops technologies to restore to people their inalienable right to be “secure in their documents”. They designed ZeroDark.cloud a framework that simplifies the development of apps that interact with the cloud, and performs tasks such as syncing, messaging & collaboration. It uses zero-knowledge encryption, ensuring the data in the cloud cannot be compromised.  They also produced the Storm4 secure cloud storage service.

Vincent has been involved in the design, invention, and production of system software and network applications for more than 30 years. In addition to producing cryptographic products, his concern about the use of encryption technology by criminal and terrorist actors has compelled him to offer assistance and training to both law enforcement and the intelligence community on cryptographic issues. He has participated at specialized venues such as with federal as well as local law enforcement agencies and the Cloud Security Alliance.

Career
Vincent Moscaritolo's experience includes roles as  Distinguished Member of Technical Staff at Silent Circle,  Principal Cryptographic Engineer for PGP Corporation, Senior Operating System engineer for Apple Computer, and Principal Software Specialist at Digital Equipment Corporation.

Vincent was one of the co founders of Silent Circle, and developer of the secure messaging technology used by Silent Circle / Blackphone.  He designed the  Silent Circle Instant Messaging Protocol (SCIMP) and was the inventor of Progressive Encryption used by the Silent Text app.

While at PGP, he focused on the engineering of cryptographic products on the OS X platform including the cross platform core crypto library, secure file deletion, virtual disk client, network kernel engine redirection module. He was also responsible for obtaining and maintaining NIST FIPS-140 validation for PGP cryptographic core.

At Apple, he was notable for founding the Mac-Crypto Conference, where key Mac developers, industry leaders and legends met to discuss topics ranging from Cryptosystems, Digital Cash and Security issues to feedback sessions where developers were able to directly discuss their requirements with Apple engineers.  He was also involved in the original Cypherpunk group.

In the mid 1980s he founded a startup called DataVox, which produced BankTalk, one of the first voice response systems for the financial marketplace. This included a user-tailorable audio menu system that provided general information, balance, account transactions and was able to communicate with bank mainframes over the existing ATM network.

Works

Vincent is currently actively publishing articles on Substack  about his Raspberry Pi projects, and also previously posted a number of articles about zero-trust on Medium

His last privacy project was the ZeroDark.cloud framework.

Moscaritolo published an article about the S4 open-source crypto library and Verifying Authenticity of Public Keys.
 
Moscaritolo designed the Silent Circle Instant Messaging Protocol (SCIMP), which uses a new progressive encryption technology.

Other cryptographic projects include the development of a public key authentication extension for file servers, authoring of IETF draft for a secure authorization protocol for distributed systems, development of code and technotes for PGP cryptographic toolkit, and a number of presentations and tutorials on modern cryptosystems and security. He was also a contributor to the Vanish, Self destructing Data project at University of Washington

He holds patents related to cryptographic techniques and designs.

Quotes
"If we can just pass a few more laws, we could all be criminals”

Personal life
Vincent currently volunteers with the Jackson County Sheriff's Search and Rescue team. He has a background in a variety of fields, including motorcycle racing and a number of martial arts.

References

External links 
 

Cypherpunks
Living people
Computer security specialists
Computer systems engineers
Modern cryptographers
Year of birth missing (living people)